St Peter's is a Neo Norman style church in Bishopsworth, Bristol, England.

History
The first church in Bishopsworth was a small chapel dedicated to St Peter and St Paul built under an arrangement in 1194 between Robert Arthur, lord of the manor, and George de Dunster, prebendary of Bedminster. The agreement provided for a chaplain to visit from Bedminster on Wednesdays, Fridays and Sundays. This provision continued until dissolution in 1540. The chapel was converted into three cottages which stood until the Corporation demolished them in 1961 to make way for a swimming pool.

The present church, dedicated to St Peter, was built in 1841–43. The neo-Norman design was the work of Samuel Charles Fripp. Construction started on the current church in 1841 and was not completed until 1842 or 1843. The church's planned tower was never completed on time. It became a parish church in 1853. It is little altered except for a vestry / porch which was added in 1877.

It has been designated by English Heritage as a grade II* listed building.

The churchyard contains war graves of four soldiers, from the airman and Royal Navy and a sailor of World War II.

See also
 Churches in Bristol
 Grade II* listed buildings in Bristol

References

Bishopsworth, Saint Peter's Church
Churches completed in 1842
19th-century Church of England church buildings
Bishopsworth, Saint Peters Church